By Time Alone is Orphanage's second album, released in October 1996 by DSFA Records. The CD features 11 tracks that have been recorded at Studio Moskou in Utrecht and was mixed and mastered at Studio RS29 in Waalwijk

Track listing
 At The Mountains of Madness - 06:08  
 Five Crystals - 04:12  
 The Dark Side - 05:14 
 Deceiver - 04:56
 Cliffs of Moher - 04:08
 By Time Alone - 03:27 
 Ancient Rhymes - 03:54 
 Odyssey - 03:15  
 Requiem - 05:25 
 Leafless - 03:59  
 Deliverance - 09:10

1996 albums
Orphanage (band) albums